Kenan (also spelled Qenan, Kaynan or Cainan) is an Antediluvian patriarch first mentioned in the Book of Genesis in the Hebrew Bible.

The Sefer ha-Yashar describes Cainan, the possessor of great astrological wisdom, which had been inscribed on tables of stone, as the son of Seth; i.e., the antediluvian Kenan grandson of Seth according to the Bible.

In scriptures 
According to Genesis 5:9–14, Kenan was a son of Enosh and a grandson of Seth. Born when Enosh was 90 years old, Kenan fathered Mahalalel when he was 70 years old. Other sons and daughters were born to Kenan before he died at 910 years of age (when Noah was aged 179 as per the Masoretic chronology). 

According to the Book of Jubilees, Kenan's mother was Noam, wife and sister of Enosh; and Kenan's wife, Mualeleth, was his sister.

He is also mentioned in the Genealogy of Jesus in Luke 3:36–37.

Family tree
The following family tree has been constructed from a variety of biblical and extra-biblical sources:

In Islam 
Kenan is mentioned in Islam in the various collections of tales of the Islamic prophets, which honor him in an identical manner.

Gallery

References

Book of Genesis people
Bereshit (parashah)
Book of Jubilees